The 1994–95 Deutsche Eishockey Liga season was the inaugural season of the Deutsche Eishockey Liga. The Kölner Haie they won the first DEL season to become German Champions.

The first season 1994-95 started with 18 teams, twelve from the old 1st Bundesliga, six from the 2nd Bundesliga.

The new league immediately attracted corporate sponsorship with the Krombacher Brewery featuring a prominent spot on the league logo.

Regular season
In the main round the 18 teams played a home-and-away schedule and, in regional groups, a second single round. After this, the play-off round of the last sixteen in the mode best of seven took place . The semi-finals and final were played in the mode best of five. The hope to be able to avoid the troubles of the old Bundesliga by stricter financial controls did not materialise in the first season. EC Hedos München, the Bundesliga's last champion, now renamed Mad Dogs Munich, folded on 18 December 1994.

GP = Games played; OTL = Overtime Loss; GF:GA = Goals for and against
Color code:  = Direct Playoff qualification,  = Playoff qualification round,  = No playoff

Playoffs
Since 16 teams qualified for the playoffs, and the Mad Dogs München folded, only the Eisbären Berlin did not participate. The first two rounds were played as a best-of-seven, and the semifinals and finals as a best-of-five.

First round

OT = Overtime; SO = Shootout

Quarterfinals

OT = Overtime; SO = Shootout

Semifinals

OT = Overtime; SO = Shootout

Finals

OT = Overtime; SO = Shootout

With the last game, the Kölner Haie became the first DEL Champion and German Champions for the 7th time in the club history.

References

1
Ger
Deutsche Eishockey Liga seasons